M/V Kennicott is a mainline ferry vessel for the Alaska Marine Highway System.

Constructed in 1998 by the Halter Marine Group in Gulfport, Mississippi, the Kennicott has been one of the most vital vessels to the Alaska ferry system since its inception. It is nine-deck, ocean certified vessel and is also able to serve as a command and logistics vessel in the event of disaster or oil spill. The ferry system, taking advantage of her ocean-going status, sends the vessel on a monthly trans-Gulf of Alaska ("cross-gulf") voyage beginning in Juneau and concluding in Kodiak. On this voyage, the Kennicott is able to provide service to the isolated Gulf of Alaska community of Yakutat and is the only vessel to do so. The cross-gulf voyages are very popular and quite often sold out. The Kennicott and the Tustumena are the Alaska Marine Highway's only accredited ocean-going vessels. The Kennicott also serves as a mainline relief ferry in the event other ferries are out of service. 

The Kennicott'''s amenities include a hot-food cafeteria; cocktail lounge and bar; solarium; forward, aft, movie, and business lounges; gift shop; 51 four-berth cabins; and 58 two-berth cabins.  The aft portion of the Kennicott appears bloated because there is an external car elevator built into the superstructure.  The elevator is used in ports without roll-on ramps allowing service to ordinary docks.  Tustumena'' is the only other ferry with this feature.

The ship struck a humpback whale in summer 2014.

References

Alaska Marine Highway System vessels
1998 ships
Ships built in Gulfport, Mississippi